The 2021–22 EPCR Challenge Cup pool stage was the first stage of the competition in what was the eighth season of the EPCR Challenge Cup. The competition involved fifteen teams competing across three pools of five teams, for ten last 16 places. The three highest-ranked clubs from each pool and the highest-ranked fourth-placed club, joined the three clubs ranked 9 to 11 from each of the Heineken Champions Cup pools, in the Round of 16. The pool stage began on 10 December 2021 and was completed on 10 April 2022.

Several round 2 matches between teams from France and the UK were postponed. This was due to new travel restrictions between the UK and France introduced by the French government on 18 December 2021.

Pool stage

The teams were allocated into three pools depending on where they finished in their respective leagues in the previous season.

Teams in the same pool will play each other once, each playing two home and two away games in the pool stage, and will receive a bye round. The pool stage will begin in December 2021, and continue through to April 2022, before the top three from each pool and the best fourth-placed side progress to the last 16.

Teams will be awarded competition points, based on match result. Teams receive four points for a win, two points for a draw, one attacking bonus point for scoring four or more tries in a match and one defensive bonus point for losing a match by seven points or fewer.

In the event of a tie between two or more teams, the following tie-breakers will be used, as directed by EPCR:
 Where teams have played each other
 The club with the greater number of competition points from only matches involving tied teams.
 If equal, the club with the best aggregate points difference from those matches.
 If equal, the club that scored the most tries in those matches.
 Where teams remain tied and/or have not played each other in the competition (i.e. are from different pools)
 The club with the best aggregate points difference from the pool stage.
 If equal, the club that scored the most tries in the pool stage.
 If equal, the club with the fewest players suspended in the pool stage.
 If equal, the drawing of lots will determine a club's ranking.

Pool A

Round 1

Round 2

 Initially postponed (with the intent to reschedule) due to travel restrictions between UK and France, but later cancelled with a 0–0 draw verdict and 2 match points to each team.

Round 3

Round 4

 Toulon awarded the 5 match points and a 28–0 victory following COVID cases within the Newcastle Falcons team.

Round 5

Pool B

Round 1

Round 2

Round 3

Round 4

Round 5

Pool C

Round 1

Round 2

 Pau awarded the 5 match points and a 28–0 victory following COVID cases within the Saracens team.

 Initially postponed (with the intent to reschedule) due to travel restrictions between UK and France, but later cancelled with a 0–0 draw verdict and 2 match points to each team.

Round 3

Round 4

Round 5

References

2021–22 EPCR Challenge Cup
EPCR Challenge Cup pool stages